Cocieri is a commune in the Republic of Moldova, and the administrative center of Dubăsari District. It is located on the eastern bank of the Dniester River, consisting of two villages, Cocieri and Vasilievca.

During 1992 War of Transnistria inhabitants of this village rebelled against the separatist authorities of Transnistria. The military unit of the 14th former Soviet Army which was located in the village was attacked by local inhabitants who armed themselves and opposed the forces of Transnistria. As result, after the war, Cocieri remained in the area controlled by the Republic of Moldova.

Population
According to the 2014 Moldovan Census, the commune had a population of 3,885, mostly residing in Cocieri. 3,717 of these were ethnic Moldovans and 168 from other ethnic groups. Due to the economic situation around 800 inhabitants work abroad.

Education
In the village is a Romanian language school with 560 pupils and a kindergarten with 100 children. Since Cocieri is in a Republic of Moldova-controlled area, the school uses the Latin script.

Political problems
Separatist authorities from Tiraspol have in the past attempted to make life more difficult for Cocieri's inhabitants. Several properties belonging to Cocieri companies were confiscated by Transnistria's authorities and 7 km² (1,700 acres) of land remains unworked because of the obstacles that the separatists put against the free movement of the people of Cocieri.

References

External links
  Webpage of Cocieri
 Interview with Ion Isaicov, mayor of Cocieri, about the problems faced by the village because of Transnistrian secessionism

Communes of Dubăsari District
Populated places on the Dniester